Songphon Anugritayawon (born 31 October 1983) is a Thai badminton player who specializes in doubles.  He had a long and successful mixed doubles partnership with Kunchala Voravichitchaikul.  Their biggest title came when they won the 2009 Japan Open. The same year, he and Voravichitchaikul took the silver medal at the Southeast Asian Games. Anugritayawon also competed at the 2006 and 2010 Asian Games, and won the men's team bronze in 2010.

Achievements

Southeast Asian Games 
Mixed doubles

Summer Universiade 
Men's doubles

Asian Junior Championships 
Mixed doubles

BWF Superseries 
The BWF Superseries, which was launched on 14 December 2006 and implemented in 2007, was a series of elite badminton tournaments, sanctioned by the Badminton World Federation (BWF). BWF Superseries levels were Superseries and Superseries Premier. A season of Superseries consisted of twelve tournaments around the world that had been introduced since 2011. Successful players were invited to the Superseries Finals, which were held at the end of each year.

Mixed doubles

  BWF Superseries Finals tournament
  BWF Superseries Premier tournament
  BWF Superseries tournament

BWF Grand Prix 
The BWF Grand Prix had two levels, the Grand Prix and Grand Prix Gold. It was a series of badminton tournaments sanctioned by the Badminton World Federation (BWF) and played between 2007 and 2017.

Mixed doubles

  BWF Grand Prix Gold tournament
  BWF Grand Prix tournament

BWF International Challenge/Series 
Men's doubles

Mixed doubles

  BWF International Challenge tournament
  BWF International Series tournament

References 

1983 births
Living people
Songphon Anugritayawon
Badminton players at the 2006 Asian Games
Badminton players at the 2010 Asian Games
Songphon Anugritayawon
Asian Games medalists in badminton
Medalists at the 2010 Asian Games
Competitors at the 2005 Southeast Asian Games
Competitors at the 2007 Southeast Asian Games
Competitors at the 2009 Southeast Asian Games
Competitors at the 2011 Southeast Asian Games
Songphon Anugritayawon
Songphon Anugritayawon
Southeast Asian Games medalists in badminton
Universiade gold medalists for Thailand
Universiade bronze medalists for Thailand
Universiade medalists in badminton
Medalists at the 2007 Summer Universiade